Jonathan Kane (born 14 May 1973) is a professional racing driver who has competed at various levels of motorsport. He currently drives for Strakka Racing in the Le Mans Series.

Kane, who was born in Comber, Northern Ireland, began his career in karting and Formula Ford. In 1994 and 1995 he raced in Formula Vauxhall and Formula Opel where he was the 1994 British winter champion and the 1995 overall British champion. He then spent two years in British Formula 3 driving for Paul Stewart Racing where he captured 6 wins and won the 1997 championship. He made four starts in Formula 3000 in 1998 with marginal results, then came to the United States and raced in Indy Lights in 1999 and 2000, winning two races and finishing 4th in series points in 1999 for Team KOOL Green. He was a test driver for the Arrows Formula One team in 2001, then moved to sports cars, driving in the Le Mans Series and American Le Mans Series with amongst others Aston Martin. In 2005 he made his FIA GT debut and has driven for TVR and Spyker.

Since 2006 Kane has competed at the 24 Hours of Le Mans with a best finish of 5th overall at the 2010 event which was also a LMP2 class victory in the HPD ARX-01C for Strakka Racing. Since 2008 Kane has completed in the LMP2 class of Le Mans Series for a number of teams including Embassy Racing and Strakka. At the 2010 1000 km of Hungaroring Kane, made history by winning the race outright in a LMP2 car co-driven by Danny Watts and Nick Leventis. This was the first time that a LMP2 car has taken first, both in qualifying (pole position) and the race.

Racing record

24 Hours of Le Mans results

Complete FIA World Endurance Championship results

References

External links
Official website (under construction — October 2010)
 

1973 births
Living people
People from Comber
Racing drivers from Northern Ireland
Formula Ford drivers
British Formula Three Championship drivers
International Formula 3000 drivers
Indy Lights drivers
European Le Mans Series drivers
24 Hours of Le Mans drivers
American Le Mans Series drivers
FIA GT Championship drivers
FIA World Endurance Championship drivers
24 Hours of Spa drivers
Porsche Carrera Cup GB drivers
Rebellion Racing drivers
Strakka Racing drivers
Arena Motorsport drivers
Paul Stewart Racing drivers
Level 5 Motorsports drivers
Andretti Autosport drivers
McLaren Racing drivers